Ampney St Peter is a small village and civil parish in the Cotswolds, part of the Cotswold of Gloucestershire, England. According to the 2014 mid year estimate the parish has a population of 75. Locally the town was known as Easington.

The Ampney Brook flows near the village, which is near to Ampney Crucis and Ampney St Mary, and is about four  miles east of Cirencester.

History

It has been scheduled as an ancient monument. Nearby is a neolithic burial pit.

The Red Lion is an 18th-century Grade II listed public house. It is on the Campaign for Real Ale's National Inventory of Historic Pub Interiors.

Religious buildings

The Anglican Church of St. Peter has late Saxon origins. It is Grade II* listed. The fabric of the current building dates from the late 12th or early 13th century and underwent Victorian restoration, and was largely rebuilt, by George Gilbert Scott in 1878. It consists of a four-bay nave and chancel with a three-stage west tower supported by diagonal buttresses.

Inside the church is a Sheela na gig. The font is from the 15th century. The Romanesque archways were moved from their original positions during the Victorian restoration.

In the churchyard is a 14th century cross which is both a listed building and has been scheduled as an ancient monument. There is also a chest tomb and gravestones to the local Taylor family.

Notable residents

The village is the hometown of Dressage Olympian Laura Bechtolsheimer, a long term member of the British Dressage team. In August 2012 the village's postbox was painted gold by Royal Mail to signify the gold medal earned by Laura Bechtolsheimer in the 2012 Olympic team dressage.

References

External links
 
 

Villages in Gloucestershire
Cotswold District